Israel Meir Freimann (also Israel Meier Freimann; b. 27 September 1830 in Cracow, then the Free City, d. 21 August 1884 in Ostrowo, then Posen Province, Germany) was a Polish-born German rabbi, philosopher, and orientalist.

Biography
Born as the younger son of Eliakum Freimann and Esther Breiter, Freimann received his education from his father and in various Talmudical schools (yeshivot) in Hungary. After attending a Gymnasium (grammar school) in 1850 in Leipzig, Saxony, where he stayed with his elder brother Isak (Eisik), in 1852 he moved to Breslau, then Prussia. There he attended the Catholic Royal  where he took his A-levels (Abitur). Between 1856 and 1860 he studied philosophy and Oriental languages at the local Silesian Frederick William University (now Wrocław University). In 1860 Landesrabbiner , the Silesian provincial chief rabbi, ordained Freimann as rabbi.

In the same year Freimann took up the rabbinate of the Jewish congregation in Filehne, later changing to the same position in Ostrowo, both then in the Prussian province of Posen. In 1865 he graduated (Ph. D.) at the Ducal Pan-Saxon University (Salana) (now Friedrich Schiller University) in Jena upon Saale, then Saxe-Weimar-Eisenach. He wrote his doctoral thesis, Ein Beitrag zur Geschichte der Ophiten (A contribution to the history of the Ophites), supervised by Dean Johann Gustav Stickel.

From 7 September 1871 on he worked as rabbi for the Israelitische Gemeinde Ostrowo, thus ending a vacancy since the death of his predecessor Aron Stössel (d. 31 May 1861). Freimann served his office in Ostrowo until his death. In 1875, after Rector Zacharias Frankel's death, Freimann declined to succeed him as rector of the Breslau-based Jewish Theological Seminary of Fraenckel's Foundation. From 1874 to 1884 Freimann gave Jewish religion classes in the Royal Gymnasium of Ostrowo. In 1900 his fellow townspeople named a street, the "Freimannstraße", in his honour. Freimann's successor was Rabbi Dr. Elias Plessner, son of the Preacher Salomon Plessner from Berlin.

Freimann's edition of the midrashic work  (We-Hizhir; 2 parts), to which he added the valuable commentary ענפי יהודה (ʿAnpēi Yehûdāh), is indisputable evidence of his learning. The responsa (בנין ציון [Binyan Ẓiyyon]) of his father-in-law Jacob Ettlinger contain many of Freimann's essays. With his wife Helene Ettlinger (1834–1902; mar. 1860) Freimann had eight children, Josef, Nanette (mar. Simonsohn), Isak, Esther (not mar.), Regina (wife of rabbi Jakob Freimann, her cousin), Judith (mar. Pinczower), Aron and Frida (mar. Czapski).

Works
author: Ein Beitrag zur Geschichte der Ophiten, Jena: Ducal Pan-Saxon University, Diss., 1865, 142 pp.
editor and commentarist: Khefetz ben Yatzliakh (aka , Khefetz Allouph), ספר והזהיר (Sēfer: Ve-hizhir): 2 vols. with Freimann's commentary ענפי יהודה (ʿAnpēi Yehûdāh)
Vol. 1: 'לסדר שמות' [Le-sēder Šemōt], Leipzig: Vollrath, 1873
Vol. 2: 'לסדר ויקרא, במדבר' [Le-sēder Vay-yiqrā, Be-midbar], Warsaw: Баумриттер, 1880

References
 Jarosław Biernaczyk, "Israel Meir Freimann", in: Alma Mater Ostroviensis - Księga Pamięci - Non Omnis Moriar, vol. X, Ostrów Wielkopolski: Komitet Organizacyjny Obchodów 600-lecia Ostrowa Wielkopolskiego and Stowarzyszenie Wychowanków "Alma Mater Ostroviensis", 2003
 Biographisches Handbuch der Rabbiner: 2 parts, Michael Brocke and Julius Carlebach (eds.), Carsten Wilke (compil.), Part 1: 'Die Rabbiner der Emanzipationszeit in den deutschen, böhmischen und großpolnischen Ländern 1781-1871': 2 vols., vol. 1, pp. 332seq., Munich: Saur, 2004–2009
 Aron Freimann, Geschichte der Israelitischen Gemeinde Ostrowo, Ostrowo: no publ., 1896. 
 Handbuch österreichischer Autorinnen und Autoren jüdischer Herkunft: 18. bis 20. Jahrhundert: 3 vols., Susanne Blumesberger, Michael Doppelhofer and Gabriele Mauthe (compils), Österreichische Nationalbibliothek (ed.), Berlin: De Gruyter, 2002, vol. 1: 'A-I', pp. 1–4541, here p. 360.
 Isidore Singer, "Freimann, Israel Meïr", in: Jewish Encyclopedia, 1901–1906, vol. 7.

External links 
Aron Freimann, Geschichte der Israelitischen Gemeinde Ostrowo, Ostrowo: no publ., 1896, retrieved on 1 October 2014.
 Isidore Singer, vol. 7

Notes

1830 births
1884 deaths
Rabbis from Kraków
Austro-Hungarian emigrants to Germany
University of Jena alumni
19th-century German rabbis
19th-century German philosophers
19th-century Polish philosophers
Polish orientalists
German orientalists
19th-century German writers
19th-century German male writers
German male non-fiction writers